The 2021 WAFF U-23 Championship was the second edition of the WAFF U-23 Championship, an under-23 international tournament for member nations of the West Asian Football Federation (WAFF). It took place in Saudi Arabia from 4 to 12 October 2021, featuring 11 teams. Only players born on or after 1 January 1998 were eligible to participate. Iran were the defending champions; however, they couldn't defend the title after they joined CAFA.

Jordan won their first tournament, beating hosts Saudi Arabia 3–1 in the final.

Teams

Participants
A total of eleven teams participated in the competition. All WAFF members, other than Qatar, agreed to take part in the tournament.

Draw
The eleven teams were drawn into three groups on 12 September 2021: Group A and B with four teams and Group C with three. The three group winners, alongside the best group runner-up, directly advanced to the knock-out stage.

Squads 

Each team had to register a squad of up to 23 players, three of whom goalkeepers.

Venues

Group stage
The three group winners and the best group runner-up advanced to the semi-finals.

All times are local, AST (UTC+3).

Group A

Group B

Group C

Ranking of second-placed teams
The best runner-up team from the three groups advanced to the semi-finals along with the three group winners. Group C contained only three teams compared to four teams in the other two groups. Therefore, the results against the fourth-placed team were not counted when determining the ranking of the runner-up teams.

Knockout stage

Bracket

Semi-finals

Final

Champion

Statistics

Goalscorers

Awards
Player of the Tournament
 Yazan Al-Naimat
Golden Boot
 Mohammad Aburiziq
Golden Glove
 Nawaf Al-Aqidi

References

WAFF Championship tournaments
2021
2021 in Saudi Arabian sport
2021 in Asian football